John Franklin Gray (September 23, 1804 – June 9, 1882) was an American educator and physician, a pioneer in the field of homoeopathy and one of its first practitioners in the United States. He is also recognized as an important medical reformer.

Biography

Early life and ancestors
John Franklin Gray was born on September 23, 1804, at Sherburne, New York and died on June 9, 1882, at the Fifth Avenue Hotel, in New York City.  He was the fourth of five sons of John Gray,  (December 15, 1769 - April 24, 1859), and the grandson of John Gray, a founder of Sherburne, and Elizabeth Skeel. Two of Dr. Gray's brothers, Dr. Alfred W. Gray (1802–1873) and Dr. Patrick Wells Gray (1806–1882), were both prominent homeopathic physicians and surgeons.  Dr. Gray's father served as a captain in Col. Samuel Whiting's 4th regiment of the Connecticut Militia in the American Revolutionary War. He was appointed and served as first Judge of the Court of Common Pleas for Chenango County, New York until 1819 when the family removed to Sheridan, Chautauqua County, New York.  His life was celebrated by the poet John Greenleaf Whittier, at his funeral in 1859 thus recalls him:

His mother was Diantha Burritt, (January 9, 1776 - October 14, 1846) the daughter of the Rev. Blackleach Burritt, who graduated from Yale College in 1765,  and was a great-great grandson  of Governor William Leete, who was the Governor of the Colony of New Haven from 1661 to 1665 and Governor of Connecticut from 1676 to 1683; and Martha Welles (1744 - April 1786) a daughter of Gideon Welles and Eunice Walker and a great-great granddaughter of Governor Thomas Welles the Fourth Colonial Governor of Connecticut. Diantha had been a school teacher in Vermont before her marriage, at Winhall, Vermont on May 26, 1793, and was a poet and woman of literary taste.

His mother was instrumental in encouraging his interest in medicine as his profession. Her favorite brother, Dr. Eli Burritt, born March 12, 1773, at Pound Ridge, Westchester County, New York and died September 1, 1823, in Troy, Rensselaer County, New York was a physician and encouraged Gray's interest in medicine as well.

He graduated from Williams College in 1800, and was licensed to practice medicine at Troy, New York, on March 29, 1802, and he quickly gained recognition for his medical skills.

Dr. Francis Wayland (1796–1865), fourth president of Brown University, said the following about his former teacher: "Dr. Burritt was a man of remarkable logical powers of enthusiastic love of his profession, and of great and deserved confidence in his own judgment. He stood at the head of his profession in Troy, and in the neighboring region, and was a person of high moral character".

Marriage and family

He married on September 25, 1826, in New York City, Elizabeth Williams Hull, born in 1808 in New Hartford, New York and died on May 28, 1868, in New York City, and is buried in Green-Wood Cemetery in Brooklyn beside her husband.

She was the daughter of  Dr. Amos Gift Hull, a prominent and eminent physician of New York City and one of the founders of the State Medical Society of New York and his third wife, Eunice Williams. She was a sister of Dr. Amos Gerald Hull (1810–1859), an 1832 graduate of Rutgers Medical College and an influential homeopathic physician who visited Samuel Hahnemann, the founder of homeopathy, in Paris, in 1836–37, of which he wrote a very interesting account of him.

John and Elizabeth were the parents of eight children, all born in New York City: Elizabeth Williams Gray, John Hull Gray, John Franklin Gray, Jr., John Frederick Schiller Gray, Josephine Augusta Gray, Emma Geraldine Hull Gray, Mary Ludlow Gray and Edward Hull Gray.

Their daughter, Elizabeth Williams Gray,  married Dr. Lewis Tillman Warner an influential and respected homeopathic physician. Their daughter, Louise Tillman Warner, married Charles Loring Brace, Jr., a graduate of Phillips Academy, Andover, Massachusetts and a graduate of Yale College class of 1876 with a degree in Civil Engineering.

He was a Mugwump in politics. He was employed as Superintendent and Engineer of Construction with the Minneapolis and St. Louis Railway at Minneapolis. When his father died in 1890, he was invited by the trustees of the New York Children's Aid Society to take up as Secretary and Chief Executive Officer of that society. A son of Louise and Charles was Gerald Warner Brace, (1901–1978) was an American writer, educator, sailor and boat builder.

He was the son of Letitia Neill of Belfast, Ireland and Charles Loring Brace,  Yale College 1846, who was a contributing philanthropist in the field of social reform. He is considered a father of the modern foster care movement and was most renowned for starting the Orphan Train movement of the mid-19th century, and for founding The Children's Aid Society in 1853.

Dr. Warner's second wife was Sarah Loring MacKaye, (1841–1876) a woman of extraordinary charm and brilliance, and a pianist of professional ability. She was the daughter of Emily Steele and Colonel James M. MacKaye, a successful attorney and an ardent abolitionist and an organizer of The Wells Fargo Express Company, and President of American Telegraph Company. Sarah was a sister of American playwright, actor, theater manager and inventor James Morrison Steele MacKaye.

Their son, John Frederick Schiller Gray, was also a physician.  He was an 1851 graduate of Williams College and an 1871 graduate of the Columbia University College of Physicians and Surgeons and practiced medicine with his father after graduating. He also practiced medicine in Paris, Nice and Geneva.  He served in the Twentieth New York Infantry and had fought at the Battle of Antietam, He gave Walt Whitman a fearful account of the battlefield at half past 9 the night following the engagement at The Vault at Pfaff's.  he later served as a major on the staff of General Edward Canby. He was a member of the Fred Gray Association.

Education

He began the study of medicine in the academy in Hamilton, New York, (now Madison University) for two years, He first entered the office of Dr. Haven, of Hamilton, New York and he stayed there for two years.  He then left for Dunkirk, New York, where he opened a private school, studying medicine all the time under Dr. Ezra Williams.

In 1824, when just 20 years old,  he removed to New York City and received instruction from Drs. Valentine Mott and David Hosack. Hosack was a physician, botanist, educator, and a founder of the Columbia University College of Physicians and Surgeons. He was also the doctor who attended to Alexander Hamilton after Hamilton's deadly duel with Aaron Burr.

It was a common practice in the early 19th century for students to receive a part of their education through a system of apprenticeships until medical schools were to assume a major role in education.  These apprenticeships usually covered a period of three years and were regulated by local medical societies.

During the time of his studies he was appointed assistant surgeon in the navy; and as it was necessary that he should be a graduate or licentiate in order to hold this position, he was accorded a license by the county medical society. He graduated from Columbia University College of Physicians and Surgeons in 1826.

Career 

Immediately after graduating and completing his residency, he opened an office on Charlton Street in New York City. In acquiring his practice he was assisted by his future father-in-law, Dr. A. G. Hull, of New York, by Dr. Hosack, and by Dr. Watts. Dr. Gray's success in obtaining patients and social patronage was very strong and rapid ; so much so, that in his first year he was enabled to get married and to support a moderate house comfortably, and in his second to sustain a doctor's horse and gig.

Soon after starting in private practice he began the study of the French language, and carried it far enough to read medical authors; two years later he began the German, and kept at it till he could read it fluently and even speak it with palpable scope and accuracy of diction.

Soon after, he learned of Hahnemann's medical theories through Hans B. Gram, a Danish doctor, who was born in Boston of Danish parents and was educated in Denmark. He heard Dr. Gram lecture, but was not convinced. He then reluctantly consented to let Dr. Gram treat one of his patients, whose case had resisted his own skill. Dr. Gram had remarkable success, not only with that patient but with others, and Dr. Gray was converted to homeopathy. He did not, however, believe that homeopathy and allopathic medicine to be mutually exclusive, but rather believed them to be complementary.

In 1828, Dr. Gray adopted homœopathy as the major rule in his practice and announced his intention to practice according to that system openly, and in consequence lost his profitable practice and all his professional friends. He endured many hardships and much ill-treatment for his devotion to homeopathy.  Dr. Gray was the first to propose the formation of a national society of homeopathy, and in 1844 the American Institute of Homeopathy was organized.

In 1833, he commenced the practice of medicine in partnership with his brother-in-law. Dr. Amos Gerald Hull.

In 1834, he founded the New York Homœopathic Society.  Its stated purpose was for the purpose of protecting, enriching and disseminating such of the propositions and testimonies of Homœopathia as upon mature trial they shall find to be sound and available. The first officers of the society were: president, John F. Gray ; vice-presidents, Edward A. Strong, George Baxter ; corresponding secretary, Federal Vanderburgh ; recording secretary, Daniel Seymour ; treasurer, F. A. Lohse ; registrar, A. Gerald Hull ; librarian, F. L. Wilsey ; finance committee, J. H. Patterson, Oliver S. Strong, L. M. H. Butler, William Bock.

This society was composed of physicians and laymen. William Cullen Bryant, the poet-editor, was a member. He was an early convert to homœopathy and all his life was a strong supporter of its principles.

Personal life and spiritualism

Every week, the Grays hosted a salon remarkable for attracting the leading artists and intellectuals of the day as well as other prominent  medical men of the city who attended, and they became well known as social leaders in the city, supporting causes such as the abolition of slavery and women's suffrage. Dr. Gray befriended the poets William Cullen Bryant, John Greenleaf Whittier and Walt Whitman and was a patron of American artists including, Asher Brown Durand and Frederic Edwin Church as well as Samuel Morse, the inventor of telegraphy

He was also a well-known and prominent Spiritualist in New York as well as a frequent lecturer on the subject. He was a close friend and associate with Kate, Leah and Margaret Fox (the Fox sisters), Andrew Jackson Davis, Amy and Isaac Post and with the Davenport brothers.

He became a noted philanthropist in his later years, especially to the poor, and was consulted in various social issues.

Awards and honors

He received the honorary degree of Doctor of Laws from Hamilton College in 1871.  He was also a life member of the New York Chapter of The Society of the Cincinnati.

Scientific American referred to Gray as "the father of homeopathy in America" in his June 1882 obituary.

Death
He died on June 9, 1882, at New York City.  He is buried in Green-Wood Cemetery in Brooklyn.

Descendants

 Dr. C. Loring Brace IV, Biological anthropologist.
Gerald Warner Brace (1901–1978) was an American writer, educator, sailor and boat builder.
Gerald Hull Gray

List of works
 The early annals of homœopathy in New York : a discourse before the Homœopathic Societies of New York and Brooklyn, on 10 April 1863, the anniversary of the birthday of Hahnemann. New York : Homœopathic Medical Society of the County of New York, 1863
 Homoeopathy in New-York, and the late Abraham D. Wilson, A.M., M.D.. New York : William S. Dorr, Printer, 1865

References

Sources
Brace, Charles Loring. The life of Charles Loring Brace, chiefly told in his own letters.  London: Sampson Low, Marston & Co., 1894.
Brace, Gerald Warner. Days that Were. New York: W.W. Norton & Company. 1976. 
Bradford, Thomas Lindsley, M.D. The Pioneers of Homœopathy.  Philadelphia : Boericke & Tafel, 1897.
Cleave, Egbert. Cleave's biographical cyclopaedia of homoeopathic physicians and surgeons.  Philadelphia: Galaxy publishing company, 1873.
Dexter, Franklin B. Biographical Sketches of the Graduates of Yale College with Annals of the College History. New York: Henry Holt & Company, 1903.
Haller, John S. American medicine in transition 1840-1910. Urbana: University of Illinois Press, ©1981. .
Hills, Alfred K.. New York Medical Times. New York: E.B. Colby & Company, 1881.
Kaplan, Justin. Walt Whitman: A Life. New York: Simon and Schuster, 1979. 
Clark, Edward S. The Stephens Family, with Collateral Branches. New York: Job Printers and Eletrotypers, 1891.
Harvard College (1780- ). Class of 1889.. Twenty-fifth anniversary, 1889-1914 : Seventh report of the class secretary.  Boston : Cockayne, 1914.
King, William Harvey, ed. 'History of Homoeopathy and Its Institutions in America. Vol. I. New York: Lewis Publishing Company, 1905.
O'Connor, Stephen. Orphan trains : the story of Charles Loring Brace and the children he saved and failed. Chicago : University of Chicago Press, 2004.1. .
Raymond, Marcius Denison Gray genealogy : being a genealogical record and history of the descendants of John Gray, of Beverly, Mass., and also including sketches of other Gray families. New York: Higginson Book Company, 1887.
Rothstein, William G. American physicians in the nineteenth century : from sects to science.  Baltimore : Johns Hopkins University Press, 1992.

Further reading
Winston, Julian. The Faces of Homeopathy: An Illustrated History of the First 200 Years. Tawa, New Zealand: Great Awk Publishing, 1999. 
Haller, John S. The history of American homeopathy : the academic years, 1820-1935. New York: Pharmaceutical Products Press, ©2005 .

Physicians from New York City
19th-century American physicians
Columbia University Vagelos College of Physicians and Surgeons alumni
1804 births
1881 deaths
American homeopaths
American spiritualists
People from Sherburne, New York
Burials at Green-Wood Cemetery